The Anniston Inn Kitchen is an event center in Anniston, Alabama, and the only remaining portion of the Old Anniston Inn.  The inn was built in 1885 as an upscale hotel for the planned company town.  The majority of the inn burned on January 2, 1923, leaving only the portion containing the kitchen, children's dining room, and servants' living quarters.

The kitchen annex matches the original inn's Queen Anne style.  The building is two-and-a-half stories tall, with dormer windows protruding from the half-story attic.  A portion of the original veranda sits along the southeast part of the exterior.   The west end is occupied by the main dining hall with 17-foot (5-meter) ceilings and exposed purlins and beams.

The building was listed on the National Register of Historic Places in 1973.

References

External links
Anniston Inn Event Center

National Register of Historic Places in Calhoun County, Alabama
Commercial buildings completed in 1885
Buildings and structures in Anniston, Alabama
Commercial buildings on the National Register of Historic Places in Alabama